Gekko lionotum, commonly known as smooth-backed gliding gecko or Burmese flying gecko, is a species of gecko found in Southeast Asia.

Distribution
It is found in southern Myanmar, Thailand (Ramri, Phang Nga Province, Bangnon, Ranong Province), Pegu, Western Malaysia, Johor: Pulau Sibu; India and Bangladesh. The type locality is from Pegu, Myanmar.

References

 Annandale, N. 1905 Additions to the Collection of Oriental Snakes in the Indian Museum, Part 3. J. Proc. Asiat. Soc. Bengal, Calcutta, new Ser., 1 (8): 208–214.
 Annandale, N. 1905 Notes on some Oriental geckos in the Indian Museum, Calcutta, with descriptions of new tons. Ann. Mag. nat. Hist. (7) 15:26-32
 Brown, Rafe M., John W. Ferner and Arvin C. Diesmos. 1997 Definition of the Philippine Parachute Gecko, Ptychozoon intermedium Taylor 1915 (Reptilia: Squamata: gekkonidae): Redescription, designation of a neotype, and comparisons with related species. Herpetologica 53 (3):357-373.
 Pawar, Samraat S. and Sayantan Biswas 2001 First record of the smooth-backed parachute gecko Ptychozoon lionotum Annandale 1905 from the Indian Mainland. Asiatic Herpetological Research. 9: 101-106

External links
 
 http://www.uroplatus.com/photopage/images/Ptychozoon%20lionotum%202.jpg 
 http://www.uroplatus.com/photopage/images/Ptychozoon_lionotum_1.jpg

Reptiles of the Malay Peninsula
Fauna of Southeast Asia
Geckos of Thailand
Gekko
Reptiles described in 1905